Paulo César Ximenes, full name Paulo César Ximenes Alves Ferreira (born December 30, 1943, in Rio de Janeiro, Rio de Janeiro), is a Brazilian economist.

He served as president of the Banco do Brasil and was 18th president of the Banco Central (analogous to the Federal Reserve in the United States) from 26 March 1993 to 9 September 1993. He has held several government portfolios and has represented Brazil in international conferences in his economist capacity many times.

References

Paulo César Ximenes's official Brazilian government's curriculum vitae

Living people
Presidents of the Central Bank of Brazil
Brazilian economists
1943 births